Chrysomantis speciosa is a species of praying mantis found in West Africa (Côte d'Ivoire, Ghana), Angola,  and the Congo River region.

See also
List of mantis genera and species

References

S
Mantodea of Africa
Insects of Angola
Insects of West Africa
Insects of the Democratic Republic of the Congo
Insects of the Republic of the Congo
Insects described in 1915